The Walker County Schools is a public school district in Walker County, Georgia, United States, based in LaFayette. It serves the communities of Chattanooga Valley, Chickamauga, Fairview, Flintstone, Fort Oglethorpe, LaFayette, Lakeview, Lookout Mountain, and Rossville.

Schools

Elementary schools
Chattanooga Valley Elementary School
Cherokee Ridge Elementary
Fairyland Elementary School
Gilbert Elementary School
Naomi Elementary School
North LaFayette Elementary School
Rock Spring Elementary School
Rossville Elementary School
Stone Creek Elementary School
Saddle Ridge Elementary School

Middle schools
Chattanooga Valley Middle School
LaFayette Middle School
Rossville Middle School
Saddle Ridge Middle School

High schools
LaFayette High School
Ridgeland High School

Closed Schools

Elementary schools

 Happy Valley Elementary School
 Fairview Elementary School

High schools

 Chattanooga Valley High School
 Rossville High School

References

External links

School districts in Georgia (U.S. state)
Education in Walker County, Georgia